Saint Petersburg State University of Architecture and Civil Engineering (SPbGASU) is a Russian federal state-owned higher education institution based in Saint Petersburg. It is the oldest architecture university in the country.

History 
SPbGASU is one of the oldest higher education establishment of its profile in Russia. Its history goes back to 1832 when it was established pursuant to the edict of the Emperor Nicholas I as the Civil Engineering Institute. Since then the University has undergone transformations and changed its name several times. The present name was given to the University on June 21, 1993.

During the 179-year period of its existence, SPbGASU has provided an excellent professional education for more than 60 000 architects and engineers including specialists who had come from over 50 foreign states. The graduates of the University have contributed a lot into the architectural outlook of Saint Petersburg and other cities of the world. Its academic staff has been well known thanks to such outstanding specialists - architects and designers - as D.I.Grimm, G.D.Grimm, V.A.Schröter, V.V.Evald, N.V.Sultanov, P.Yu.Suser, A.I.Gogen, A.I.Dmitriev, I.S.Kitner, G.P.Perederiy, K.V.Makovskiy, G.M.Maniser,  to name just the few, as well as Senior Lecturers and Professors M.V.Ostrogradskiy, V.V.Ckobeltzin, E.H.Lentz, N.A.Belieliubskiy, N.A.Boguslavskiy, F.S.Yasinskiy, V.A.Gastev, C.N.Numerov, N.Ya.Panarin, P.I.Bozhenov, B.I.Dalmatov, L. М. Khidekel, S.M.Shifrin, N.F.Fiedorov and many others.

During the period after the WW II, the University's graduates participated in the restoration of the city and industrial objects much destroyed by the enemy. The second half of the 20th century was the time when professional knowledge and expertise, experience and traditions were accumulated, and highly qualified specialists in architecture and construction were entitled to start solving actual tasks in architecture, town-planning and creating a residence milieu adhering to the laws of aesthetics, functionality and safety. The economically hard period of so-called "perestroika" (1990s) was gone through relatively painlessly thanks to the selflessness and hard efforts made by the core staff and University administration under the guidance of Professor Ju.P.Panibratov who occupied then the post of the Rector. The university started working in the 21st century having become stronger: new faculties came into being, as well as new computer classes, scientific centres, cooperation agreements with other world's leading universities and scientific institutions, which made the University ready for all kinds of transformations and changes if they were necessary. Since the early 21st century the number of the SPbGASU graduates is over 1000 highly qualified professionals.

Its graduates were the authors of the General Development plan of the city (V.A.Kamenskiy, A.I. Naumov), the architectural plans of the Kirov Stadium (A.S.Nikolskiy), BCH “Oktiabrskiy” (G.P.Morozov), the ensemble of the Victory Square with the Monument to the Heroic Defenders of the City (architect S.B.Speranskiy, V.A.Kamenskiy and sculptor M.A. Anikushin), the hotel “Pribaltiyskaya” (N.N.Baranov and others), a lot of underground stations "Avtovo", "Baltiyskaya", "Gorkovskaya", "Grazhdansky Prospekt", "Yelizarovskaya", "Kirovsky Zavod", "Moskovskaya", "Narvskaya", "Ploshchad Alexandra Nevskogo I", "Politekhnicheskaya", "Tekhnologichesky Institut" and others).

The University is actively cooperating with the City Government in making scientifically approved decisions in regard of reconstruction of the city historical centre and its suburbs. Scientists from the leading chairs and scientific-technical centres affiliated to the University have recently carried out a number of works in the historical centre's reconstruction and new districts` development. For example, research workers from the Science-Production Consulting Geotechnology Centre affiliated to SPbGASU (director of the Centre is Prof. R.A. Mangushev) are participating in working out territorial technical normative documents, carrying out expertise, investigations, engineering and geological research, laboratory and field tests, making projects of complicated types of basements, constructing, hydro-isolating and reinforcing the basements of buildings and structures.

A great number of works in restoration of original hydro-isolating and making a new one have been made by the production firm “Podzemstroyrekonstruktsia” under the scientific supervision of Professor A.B.Fadeev (among the objects there was Flat-Museum of the great Russian poet A.S.Pushkin in Moika River embankment, the house-estate of G.R.Dershavin in Fontanka River embankment, the building of the Russian National Library, etc.). During the last three years the research workers of the University have taken part in erecting the monument to the first Greek President I.Kapodistriy (1827-1831), who had headed the Foreign Affairs Department in Russia in 1816–1822, there have been reconstructed the hydro-isolation in the trading complex “Sennaya”.

The University's laboratories with their modern equipment enable to carry out the investigation of the technical condition of buildings and structures using methods that avoid destruction. Specialists from the University implement the expertise of projects, design works, calculations, etc. including the expertise of industrial safety. So, in view of the approaching 300-year anniversary of Saint-Petersburg, under the supervision of Professor V.N.Bronin, there were researched and investigated a number of historical buildings and structures before starting the reconstruction work. Among them there were Rostral Columns (architect G.Trezini, J.Thoma de Thomon, 1810-1811), Saint Michael's Castle (architect V.Brenna, 1796-1801), the eastern wing of the Military Headquarters in the Palace Square (the Palace Square ensemble, architect K.Rossi, 1819-1829), etc.

Today, the University has been successfully upholding its glorious old traditions. SPbGASU is recognized as one of the best higher education establishments in the field of architecture and engineering in Russia that meets the education, training and research needs of students and faculty, as well as the multi-level training needs of the larger community.
The University has an outstanding faculty of 629 men and women, many of whom are recognized for their scholarship. It numbers 4 Corresponding Members and 7 Councillors of Russian Academy of Architecture and Construction Sciences, 89 Doctors of Science and 357 Ph.D.s. Presently there are approximately 8400 students, among them 282 foreign students from 54 different countries of the world, concentrating their studies in science and engineering, and 243 post-graduates (among them 21 foreigners), working on their Ph.D. and DSc theses at the University.

SPbGASU is also well known as one of the leading scientific-analytical centres in Russia. Scientific-research work is being carried out in the fields of science and construction practically in all directions. They cover the whole range of production processes - from concept creation up to its practical implementation and exploitation of buildings, with investments being made of the advanced scientific ideas into the educational process. Scientific-research and innovation activities are aimed at fundamental and applied field research development, modern production needs satisfaction, educational system perfection. A close alliance between science and education is a necessary provision for training highly qualified specialists. Annual and periodical international conferences, seminars and round tables are held at the University where actual problems of modern science and technology are discussed.

The University carries out its editorial activities publishing educational and scientific literature. Important elements of the innovation infrastructure of the University are: Scientific-Technical Council; Scientific-Technical Library which is a treasury of modern scientific-technical literature and rarities; basic chairs and scientific research laboratories. Scientific-research results received by the University specialists are published in leading profile scientific journals and other publications. (“Vestnik Grazhdanskih Inzhenerov”, “Ingenernije Sistiemi”,“Peterburgskiy Stroitelniy Rinok”, etc.).

SPbGASU has international cooperation with other academic institutions, government agencies and private organizations. The University has successfully cooperated in joint research work with partners from Germany, Italy, France, Austria, Poland, Finland, USA, China, etc. The University is also well known for international scientific conferences regularly held here. According to Student Exchange Programme, many Russian students go abroad to study whereas foreigners come to study to Saint Petersburg which proves to be very useful for both sides.
Departments

Educational activities 
The university has about 10,000 students, 117 classrooms, 28 teaching laboratories located in 55 specially equipped classrooms, and five educational and computer centers. It has 638 teachers, including 420 with academic degrees and titles, one member of Russian Academy of Architecture and Construction Sciences (RAACS), as well as five corresponding members and seven councilors of the Academy. There are seven faculties and 48 departments. Along with the pre-existing ones (construction, architecture, operation of vehicles), in recent years it has expanded to new areas of training (combined heat and power, metrology, standardization and certification, management, urban planning, land management and inventories, and others). It offers bachelor's and master's degrees in 26 major professional educational programs and 17 postgraduate programs of additional vocational training. Throughout its history, the university has trained about 70,000 specialists, including about 2,000 foreign students from more than 50 countries.

It partners with government of several countries to provide scholarship opportunities for students especially from Africa and Asia. Currently there are a couple of Africans from Nigeria, Congo, Rwanda etc studying at the university.

Faculties 
 Faculty of architecture
 Faculty of civil engineering
 Faculty of environmental engineering and municipal services
 Faculty of automobile and road-building
 Faculty of economics and management
 Faculty of forensics and law in construction and transport

Famous alumni 

 Zivar bey Ahmadbeyov (1902) – Azerbaijani architect, chief architect of Baku (1918–1922)
 Gavriil Baranovsky (1882) – Russian architect, civil engineer, art historian, and publisher
 Gennady Buldakov (1951) – Soviet architect, academician of architecture, chief architect of Leningrad (1971–1986)
 Józef Gosławski (1891) – Polish architect
 Eduard Gurwits (1971) – Ukrainian politician, the mayor of Odessa
 Andrey Dostoyevsky (1848) – Russian architect, memoirist, brother of writer Fyodor Dostoyevsky
 Mikhail Eisenstein (1893) – Riga architect, father of director Sergei Eisenstein
 Lidia Klement (1960) – singer
 Evgeny Kliachkin (1957) – Russian and Israeli poet, singer, entertainer
 Fyodor Livchak (1904) – Russian architect
 Wacław Michniewicz (1893) – Polish and Lithuanian architect
 Yevgeny Nesterenko (1961) – opera singer (bass)
 Marian Peretyatkovich (1901) – Russian architect
 Sergei Polonsky (1972) – Russian architect, builder and developer
 Volodymyr Sichynskyi (1917) – Ukrainian architect, graphic artist and art critic

References 

Universities in Saint Petersburg
Educational institutions established in 1832
Architecture schools in Russia